United Nations Security Council Resolution 1677, adopted unanimously on May 12, 2006, after reaffirming previous resolutions on East Timor (Timor-Leste), particularly Resolution 1599 (2005), the Council renewed the mandate of the United Nations Office in Timor-Leste (UNOTIL) until June 20, 2006.

The resolution was adopted after unrest in which five people were killed in mob violence after a large portion of the national army was dismissed.

Details
The Security Council expressed concern over incidents that occurred on April 28 and 29, 2006 and the ensuing situation, while acknowledging the role of the Timorese government to investigate the incidents. Extending UNOTIL's mandate, the Council requested the Secretary-General Kofi Annan to provide an update on the situation and the role of the peacekeeping operation with a view to taking further action.

Finally, the resolution encouraged the Timorese government and institutions to address the causes of the recent violence with assistance from UNOTIL.

See also
 2006 East Timorese crisis
 East Timor Special Autonomy Referendum
 List of United Nations Security Council Resolutions 1601 to 1700 (2005–2006)
 Operation Astute

References

External links
 
Text of the Resolution at undocs.org

 1677
2006 in East Timor
 1677
May 2006 events